South Boston Historic District is a national historic district located at South Boston, Halifax County, Virginia. The district includes 594 contributing buildings and 7 contributing structures in the Village of South Boston.  It consists of industrial, commercial, and residential building types dating from the mid-19th century to the present.  Notable buildings include the C.H. Friend School, New Brick Warehouse (c. 1930), Planters and Merchants Bank, Halifax Cotton Mill, R.J. Reynolds
Tobacco Company tobacco prizery, former Liggett-Meyer Tobacco Company tobacco prizery, the Parkinson Block (1899), First Presbyterian Church (1887), First Baptist Church (c. 1900), and Mt. Olive Baptist Church (c. 1900).

It was listed on the National Register of Historic Places in 1986, with a boundary increase in 2009.

References

External links
 Planters and Merchants Bank, 209 Main Street, South Boston, Halifax County, VA at the Historic American Buildings Survey (HABS)

Historic districts in Halifax County, Virginia
National Register of Historic Places in Halifax County, Virginia
Historic American Buildings Survey in Virginia
Historic districts on the National Register of Historic Places in Virginia